Documento Nacional de Identidad means "National Identity document" in Spanish. It is the name used by:

 Documento Nacional de Identidad (Argentina)
 Documento Nacional de Identidad (Spain)
 Documento Nacional de Identidad (Peru)